Calamai is an Italian surname. Notable people with the surname include:

Baldassare Calamai (1797–1851), Italian painter
Clara Calamai (1909–1998), Italian actress
Piero Calamai (1897–1972), Italian sailor

Italian-language surnames